The 60th Air Mobility Wing (60 AMW) is the largest air mobility organization in the United States Air Force and is responsible for strategic airlift and air refueling missions around the world. It is the host unit at Travis Air Force Base in California.  Wing activity is primarily focused on support in the Middle East region, however it also maintains operations in areas of the Pacific and Indian Oceans.

Units
 
 60th Operations Group (60 OG)
 6th Air Refueling Squadron (6 ARS) KC-10A
 9th Air Refueling Squadron (9 ARS) KC-10A
 21st Airlift Squadron (21 AS) C-17A
 22d Airlift Squadron (22 AS) C-5M
 60th Aeromedical Evacuation Squadron
 60th Operations Support Squadron 

 60th Maintenance Group (60 MXG) 
 60th Mission Support Group (60 MSG) 
 60th Medical Group (60 MDG)

Additionally, the 60th Comptroller Squadron (60 CPTS) reports directly to the wing staff.

History

United States Air Forces in Europe
The 60th Air Mobility Wing traces its origins to the establishment of the 60th Troop Carrier Wing on 1 July 1948 at Kaufbeuren Air Base, Occupied Germany.  The wing was established in accordance with the Hobson Plan organizational structure established by the United States Air Force in 1948.  Assigned to the new wing was the 60th Troop Carrier Group (60th TCG), which served as its operational component.  The 60th TCG was assigned three flying squadrons: the 10th, 11th, and 12th Troop Carrier Squadrons, which were assigned C-54 Skymaster transports.  Support units of the 60th TCW in 1948 were the 60th Airdrome Group; the 60th Maintenance & Supply Group and the 60th Medical Group.

The 60th TCG, however, was detached, supporting the Berlin Airlift from other bases.  The wing operated under control of the provisional airlift task force from 29 July 1948 but was not directly involved in airlift operations until it moved to RAF Fassberg, Germany in January 1949.  From 20 to 26 January September 1949, the group flew Berlin airlift missions.  Its C-54s primarily carried coal into West Berlin.  On 29 January 1949, the wing's headquarters element moved to RAF Fassberg and fell under operational control of the 1st Airlift Task Force. There, the 60th gained operational control of the 313th Troop Carrier Group, the 513th Air Base Group, the 513th Maintenance and Supply Group, and the 513th Medical Group.

When the Berlin Airlift ended on 26 September 1949, the 60th began moving without its personnel and equipment to Wiesbaden Air Base, West Germany, where it assumed the resources of the inactivated 7150th Air Force Composite Wing. The 60th Troop Carrier Wing became operational at Wiesbaden on 1 October 1949, and United States Air Forces Europe re-designated the wing again as the 60 TCW (Medium) on 16 November 1949. On 21 January 1951, Twelfth Air Force became the 60th's new higher headquarters. 

At this time, the wing had no tactical mission.  On 2 June 1951, the wing replaced the 61st Troop Carrier Wing at Rhein-Main Air Base, where the 60th had been stationed on detached service. At this time, the 60th TCW resumed a tactical role and assumed responsibility for controlling all US tactical airlift resources in Europe. The 60th TCW provided logistic airlift services to US and Allied forces in Europe while maintaining host unit responsibilities at Rhein-Main. Operating the C-82 Packet, C-119 Flying Boxcar, and C-47 Skytrain aircraft, the wing participated in countless exercises and provided air transportability training to US Army units.

On 1 August 1955 the wing was assigned to the 322d Air Division and moved to Dreux Air Base, France. Later that month, the 62d Troop Carrier Squadron, a Tactical Air Command rotational unit from Sewart Air Force Base, Tennessee, arrived and entered attached status with the 60th. From 22 March to 2 June 1956, the 309th Troop Carrier Group, Assault (Fixed Wing), from Ardmore Air Force Base, Oklahoma deployed to Dreux. Initially, attached to the 60th for logistical support and operational control, the 309th was officially assigned to the wing on 8 August 1956. The 309th introduced the C-123 Provider to the European theater.

In a major reorganization, the 322nd reduced the headquarters elements of the 60th, 309th, and the 60th Mission and Support Group to one officer and one airman each on 15 November 1956. In conjunction with this, the 60th's chief of operations gained control of the flying squadrons. All three groups inactivated on 12 March 1957. In mid-1958, the 376th, 377th, and 378th Troop Carrier Squadrons, formerly assigned to the 309th, transitioned from the C-123 to the C-119 aircraft. Then on 25 September 1958, the 60th Troop Carrier Wing was inactivated, ending its first period of service. With the exception of the 10th, 11th, and 12th Troop Carrier Squadrons (which now reported directly to the 322d Air Division) all other units that were assigned to the 60th were also inactivated.

Military Airlift Command

The 60th Military Airlift Wing was re-activated on 27 December 1965 and replaced the Military Air Transport Service (MATS) 1501st Air Transport Wing, Heavy, as the "host-wing" at Travis Air Force Base, California, on 8 January 1966.   This was as a result of the inactivation of MATS provisional organizations and the establishment of United States Air Force permanent units of the new Military Airlift Command (MAC), which replaced MATS as the primary USAF strategic airlift command.  The newly-activated 22d Air Force (successor to the Western Transport Air Force of the Military Air Transport Service) at Travis became the new parent organization for the 60th.

Flying the C-124 Globemaster IIs, the C-130 Hercules, the C-141A Starlifter, and the C-133 Cargomaster, the 60th entered service while the US was beginning a major buildup of its military forces in Southeast Asia. The 60th quickly established a strategic aerial pipeline to the region, whose support of US forces in South Vietnam earned the unit three Air Force Outstanding Unit Awards. In 1966, the wing became the first recipient of the Air Force Logistic Systems Award. Assigned to the wing on 8 January 1966, the C-141-equipped 75th Military Airlift Squadron transitioned to the C-5 Galaxy, becoming the Military Air Command's first operational squadron to fly the new transport aircraft. On 6 February 1972, the wing added a second C-5 squadron, when the 22d Military Airlift Squadron activated at Travis.

In the spring of 1973, the 60th Military Airlift Wing became a major participant in Operation HOMECOMING, the repatriation of American prisoners of war from North Vietnam. As the C-141s arrived with the former POWs, the David Grant Medical Center at Travis became a major processing facility for the returnees. HOMECOMING marked the official termination of US involvement in the Vietnam War.

During the fall of 1973, the 60th supported Operation NICKEL GRASS, the support of Israel during the Yom Kippur War in the Middle East. As the Military Air Command's prime representative in this operation, the 60th flew 36 C-5 and C-141 missions and delivered over 22,000 tons of supplies and equipment.

With the Communist takeover of Cambodia and South Vietnam imminent, MAC diverted a C-5, flown by the 22nd Military Airlift Squadron, from Clark Air Base in the Philippines to Tan Son Nhut Air Base near Saigon to fly the first Operation BABYLIFT mission. Both BABYLIFT and Operation NEW LIFE missions transported thousands of refugees to the United States during April–May 1975. By the end of Operation BABYLIFT, MAC carriers airlifted 1,794 Southeast Asian orphans to their new American families. Military Air Command C-141s carried 949 of those babies.

In October 1974, the 60th began supporting Operation DEEP FREEZE missions, the annual resupply of scientific research teams in the Antarctic. Flying from Christchurch, New Zealand, the wing had logged a near perfect record for reliability. On 4 October 1989, a 60th Military Airlift Wing C-5 became the first "Galaxy" to land on the Antarctic continent. For airlift achievements during the 1970s, the wing earned two more Air Force Outstanding Unit Awards (AFOUA).

To upgrade cargo carrying capacity, MAC initiated a major upgrade program for its C-141A fleet beginning in 1979. The project added an in-flight refueling system and 23 feet in length to the fuselage. The stretched "Starlifter" was designated the C-141B. The 60th sent its first C-141A to the Lockheed-Georgia Company on 13 August 1979. The wing received its last "B" model on 10 May 1982.

A highly visible instrument of US foreign policy, the 60th played an important role in maintaining the balance of power in the world during the 1980s. Supporting US naval forces in the Indian Ocean and Gulf of Arabia (sic), the wing flew frequent missions to Diego Garcia and other installations in the region. When underwater mines, suspected to have been placed by Iran, threatened the Red Sea shipping lanes in 1984, the 60th airlifted minesweeping helicopters from Naval Air Station Norfolk, VA, to Rota, Spain, where the Navy assembled and carried them into action via surface vessel. In 1987, a similar situation in the Persian Gulf resulted in the deployment of the same helicopter minesweepers.

Throughout the 1980s, the wing supported several important troop deployments to Central America. The deployments demonstrated US resolve to oppose corrupt dictatorships and Soviet-backed governments. Operation URGENT FURY in 1983 took the Caribbean island-nation of Grenada out of the hands of Soviet-backed Cubans. Operation GOLDEN PHEASANT in 1988 projected US strength to counter Nicaraguan incursions into Honduras; Operation NIMROD DANCER in May 1989 showed US opposition to Panamanian dictator Manuel Noriega; and Operation JUST CAUSE in December 1989 and January 1990 toppled Noriega from power and led to his arrest and trial in the US. For its participation in JUST CAUSE, the 60th earned another AFOUA.

Members of the 60th have participated in countless humanitarian airlift missions over the years. When earthquakes devastated Mexico City in 1985, a 60th Military Airlift Wing C-5 was one of MAC's first aircraft to deliver relief equipment. In December 1988 and early 1989, personnel assigned to the 60th Aerial Port Squadron helped load Soviet IL-62 aircraft with medical supplies and relief equipment for shipment to earthquake victims in Armenia. In 1989, the wing carried relief supplies to Charleston, South Carolina and the US Virgin Islands to assist victims of Hurricane Hugo. Later that year, crews also flew relief equipment and personnel to San Francisco's south bay area to assist victims of the 1989 Loma Prieta earthquake. The 60th played a key role in Operation FIERY VIGIL. During June and July 1991, repeated eruptions of Mount Pinatubo in the Philippines, buried Clark Air Base with tons of volcanic ash, thus forcing an emergency evacuation of US military dependents and non-essential military personnel.

Modern era

Driven by the end of the Cold War, economic factors and a smaller perceived threat to its security, the US completely reorganized the Department of Defense and significantly reduced its military forces, beginning in 1989. During 1991 and 1992, the Air Force underwent the most massive restructuring since its establishment as a separate service in 1947. With the restructuring, MAC became the Air Mobility Command (AMC) and absorbed the tanker airlift resources of the former Strategic Air Command (SAC). As the "objective" wing became the hallmark of the new Air Force, AMC re-designated the 60th as the 60th Airlift Wing on 1 November 1991.

On 2 August 1990, the armies of Iraqi dictator Saddam Hussein invaded the neighboring tiny, oil-rich nation of Kuwait. Responding to a request for assistance from King Fahd Ibn Abdul Aziz of Saudi Arabia, US President George Bush ordered troops to the region as part of Operation DESERT SHIELD. A coalition of 27 allied nations supported the efforts with troops, money, medical teams, supplies, and equipment. Operation DESERT STORM, the coalition move to remove the Iraqi troops from Kuwait, began on 17 January 1991. The 60th played a vital role throughout the course of Operation DESERT SHIELD/STORM, by flying 1,280 C-5 and 954 C-141 missions from Travis Air Force Base. The airlift portion of the operation was nicknamed Operation VOLANT WIND.

Relief efforts kept the 60th busy.  Beginning in August 1990, the wing provided airlift and logistic support to US and coalition forces in Southwest Asia, while continuing to perform worldwide airlift operations, including humanitarian missions to nations to Latin America and the former Soviet Union.  In 1992–1993, commenced airlift in support of U.S. relief operations in Somalia during Operations PROVIDE RELIEF and RESTORE HOPE.  It continued to support on-going operations in Southwest Asia during Operation SOUTHERN WATCH.  The wing's elements also supported Operation PROVIDE COMFORT for Kurdish refugees, supported the evacuation of military personnel and their dependents from the Philippines through Operation FIERY VIGIL in 1991, and provided airlift support to Balkans peacekeeping missions beginning in 1995 with Operation JOINT ENDEAVOR, and continuing under Operations JOINT GUARD and JOINT FORGE.  It deployed tanker and support elements to the European theater during Operation ALLIED FORCE from March–June 1999, as well as providing airlift support to other air expeditionary forces deploying to the operation.

After 11 September 2001 terrorist attacks on the World Trade Center and the Pentagon, the 60th began airlift and refueling operations in support of Operations NOBLE EAGLE and ENDURING FREEDOM. In March 2003, the United States as part of the Global War on Terrorism, initiated Operation IRAQI FREEDOM.

One 8 August 2006, the 60th received its first C-17 Globemaster III aircraft "The Spirit of Solano". The next day, that aircraft was made operational and flew its first mission. The wing won top honors as the best Air Mobility Wing during the 2007 Air Mobility Rodeo. On 5 November 2008, the 60th received its 13th and final C-17 aircraft, "The Spirit of Travis." Fifteen members of the Travis family were on hand to witness the aircraft's arrival.

From February to August 2008, the 21st Airlift Squadron with C-17A Globemaster IIIs deployed as a squadron in support of the Operations ENDURING AND IRAQI FREEDOM. Their involvement in the operations garnered the squadron an Air Force Outstanding Unit Award with Valor. The 60th Air Mobility Wing continued to answer the call to action whenever it is needed.

From January–February 2010, the 60th Air Mobility Wing’s C-17s of the 21st Airlift Squadron spearheaded the U.S. humanitarian response to the massive Haitian earthquake during Operation UNIFIED RESPONSE. In addition, the 60th Medical Group deployed and operated the largest land-based emergency hospital in Haiti in the weeks immediately after the earthquake.

In March 2011, the 60th Air Mobility Wing supported three simultaneous new operations, while continuing to support combat operations in Iraq and Afghanistan. The first of these operations, Operation TOMODACHI, responded to the tsunami in northeastern Japan and the resulting damage at the Fukushima Daiichi nuclear power plant by delivering relief supplies, rescue teams, and nuclear experts. In the second operation, Operation PACIFIC PASSAGE, the wing and its Travis AFB partners received over 2600 military volunteer evacuees and their pets from U.S. bases in Japan threatened by radiation leaking from the damaged nuclear power plant. In the third operation, Operation ODYSSEY DAWN, the 60th Air Mobility Wing provided support to the NATO operation to protect anti-Gadaffi rebels during the Libyan Civil War.

From late-October–November 2012, the 60th Air Mobility Wing rapidly responded to the President’s call to assist the Federal Emergency Management Agency in restoring utilities in areas of the northeastern U.S. devastated by "Superstorm" Sandy. Utility repair crews and their equipment from throughout the western U.S. found their way to the northeast aboard Travis C-5s and C-17s.

Lineage

 Established as 60th Troop Carrier Wing, Medium, and activated, on 1 July 1948
 Redesignated: 60th Troop Carrier Wing, Heavy, on 5 November 1948
 Redesignated: 60th Troop Carrier Wing, Medium, on 16 November 1949
 Inactivated on 25 September 1958
 Redesignated 60th Military Airlift Wing, and activated, on 27 December 1965
 Organized on 8 January 1966 , assuming personnel and equipment of 1501st Air Transport Wing (MATS) which was discontinued.
 Redesignated: 60th Airlift Wing on 1 November 1991
 Redesignated: 60th Air Mobility Wing on 1 October 1994
 Designated 60th Air Expeditionary Wing in September 2001 when wing elements deployed to combat areas.

Assignments
 United States Air Forces in Europe, 1 July 1948
 Attached to: Airlift Task Force [Provisional], 29 July – 3 November 1948
 Attached to: 1 Air Lift Task Force, 4 November 1948 – 19 January 1949
 1 Air Lift Task Force, 20 January 1949
 United States Air Forces in Europe, 26 September 1949
 Twelfth Air Force, 21 January 1951
 Attached to 322d Air Division [Combat Cargo], 1 April 1954 – 31 July 1955
 322d Air Division (Combat Cargo), 1 August 1955 – 25 September 1958
 Military Air Transport Service, 27 December 1965
 Twenty-Second Air Force, 8 January 1966
 Military Airlift, Travis, 15 February 1979
 Twenty-Second Air Force, 21 July 1980
 Fifteenth Air Force, 1 July 1993
 Eighteenth Air Force, since 1 October 2003
 Air Mobility Command when wing elements deployed to combat areas any time after 11 September 2001.

Components
Groups
 60th Troop Carrier (later, 60th Military Airlift; 60th Operations) Group: 1 July 1948 – 12 March 1957 (detached 1 July 1948 – 1 June 1951); 6 March 1978 – 15 February 1979; since 1 November 1991
 309th Troop Carrier Group: attached 22 March – 7 August 1956, assigned 8 August 1956 – 12 March 1957
 313th Troop Carrier Group: attached 20 January – 18 September 1949

Squadrons

United States Air Forces in Europe 
 10th Troop Carrier Squadron: attached 15 November 1956 – 11 March 1957, assigned 12 March 1957 – 25 September 1958
 11th Troop Carrier Squadron: attached 18–26 September 1949; attached 15 November 1956 – 11 March 1957, assigned 12 March 1957 – 25 September 1958
 12th Troop Carrier Squadron: attached 15 November 1956 – 11 March 1957, assigned 12 March 1957 – 25 September 1958
 376th Troop Carrier Squadron: attached 15 November 1956 – 11 March 1957, assigned 12 March 1957 – 25 September 1958
 377th Troop Carrier Squadron: attached 15 November 1956 – 11 March 1957, assigned 12 March 1957 – 25 September 1958
 378th Troop Carrier Squadron: attached 15 November 1956 – 11 March 1957, assigned 12 March 1957 – 25 September 1958
 776th Troop Carrier Squadron: attached 28 October 1954 – 1 May 1955
 778th Troop Carrier Squadron: attached 28 April – c. 1 November 1955
 7206 Air Transport Squadron: attached  – 1 March November 1957.

Military Airlift Command
 7th Military Airlift Squadron: 13 March 1971 – 6 March 1978; 15 February 1979 – 1 November 1991
 22d Military Airlift Squadron: 8 February 1972 – 6 March 1978; 15 February 1979 – 1 November 1991
 28th Military Airlift Squadron: 8 January 1966 – 8 July 1967 (detached 1–8 July 1967)
 44th Military Airlift Squadron: 8 January 1966 – 1 March 1972
 75th Military Airlift Squadron: 8 January 1966 – 6 March 1978; 15 February 1979 – 1 November 1991
 84th Military Airlift Squadron: 8 January 1966 – 1 July 1971
 85th Military Airlift Squadron: 8 January 1966 – 8 July 1967
 86th Military Airlift Squadron: 8 January 1966 – 6 March 1978; 15 February 1979 – 1 November 1991

Air Mobility Command
 19th Airlift Squadron: 1 November 1993 – 31 December 1996
 20th Airlift Squadron: 1 November 1993 – 31 December 1998

Stations
 Kaufbeuren AB, Germany, 1 July 1948
 RAF Fassberg, Germany, 20 January 1949
 Wiesbaden AB, Germany (later West Germany), 1 October 1949
 Rhein-Main AB, West Germany, 2 June 1951
 Dreux AB, France, 15 October 1955 – 25 September 1958
 Travis AFB, California, since 8 January 1966

Aircraft
 Primarily C-54, 1949; C-47, 1949; C-82, 1951–1953; C-119, 1951, 1953–1958; and C-123, 1956–1958
 Also operated, in fewer numbers, C-45, 1948; C-74, 1948; B-17, 1949–1951; B-26, 1949–1951; C-47, 1949–1951, 1951–1955; C-54, 1949–1951, 1951–1952; C-82, 1949–1951; L-5, 1949–1951; L-20, 1955
 Primarily C-124, 1966–1967; C-130, 1966; C-133, 1966–1971; C-141, 1966–1997; C-5, 1970–; C-17, 2006–; and KC-10, since 1994
 Also operated, in fewer numbers, VC/C-54, 1966–1969; VT/T-29, 1966–1973; U-3, 1966–1968; C-47, 1968–1969; C-131, 1969–1975; T-39, 1969–1975; WC-135, 1993.

Unit shields

References

 Ravenstein, Charles A. Air Force Combat Wings Lineage and Honors Histories, 1947–1977. Maxwell AFB, Alabama: Office of Air Force History, 1984. .
 60th Air Mobility Wing History Office
 Rogers, Brian. United States Air Force Unit Designations Since 1978. Hinkley, UK: Midland Publications, 2005. .

Notes

External links
Travis AFB public site

0060
Military units and formations in California